is a Japanese voice actor from Tottori Prefecture, Japan. He is affiliated with Aoni Production.

Filmography

Anime
A Destructive God Sits Next to Me – Homeroom Teacher
Anohana: The Flower We Saw That Day – Tetsudō "Poppo" Hisakawa
Aokana: Four Rhythm Across the Blue – Shion Aoyagi
Aquarion Logos – Shintaro Hayashi
Argevollen – Tsutomu Kutsuwada
Atelier Rorona: The Alchemist of Arland – Tantoris
Bakugan Battle Brawlers – Shinjiro Kuso, Rikimaru, Klaus Von Hertzon, Takashi, Preyas Angelo/Predator Angelo
Bakugan Battle Brawlers: New Vestroia – Shinjiro Kuso, Klaus Von Hertzon
Basquash! – Naviga Stelte
Beelzebub - Killer Machine Abe
Buso Renkin – Kouji Rokumasu
Classroom Crisis – Sakugo Maioka
Eien no 831 – Older Sakata Twin
Genshiken Nidaime – Souichirou Tanaka
Godannar – Go Saruwatari
Golden Time – Hoshhi
Hitorijime My Hero – Hōjō
Hyōka – Jun'ya Nakajō
Kyouran Kazoku Nikki – Ouka Midarezaki
Medarot – as Kantaroth
My Senpai Is Annoying – Hijikata
Otome Yōkai Zakuro – Takatoshi Hanadate
Oscar's Oasis – Buck
Pandora Hearts – Fang
Rockman EXE Stream - ShineMan, Bōsōzoku (B), Nenjiro, Observer (A)
Shakugan no Shana – Eita Tanaka
Shakugan no Shana Second – Eita Tanaka
Shakugan no Shana III Final – Eita Tanaka
Shokugeki no Soma - Donato Gotōda, Julio Shiratsu
The Legend of Heroes: Trails of Cold Steel – Northern War – Logan Mugart, Wallace Bardias
The Prince of Tennis – Shuichiro Oishi
The Prince of Tennis II: U-17 World Cup – Kiko Balentien
The Vampire Dies in No Time – Kameya
The World is Still Beautiful – Kitora
Tokyo Ghoul – Take Hirako
Transformer CarRobot – Mach Alert/Super Mach Alert, Dangar
Tsurune: The Linking Shot – Kōshirō Fuwa
Umineko: When They Cry – Ootsuki
Upotte!! – Genkoku
Utawarerumono – Suwonkas
Yu-Gi-Oh! Duel Monsters – Hiroto Honda (Tristan Taylor (Episodes 1-51))

Advertisement
Trailers for the Ace Attorney series – Phoenix Wright

Tokusatsu
Juken Sentai Gekiranger – Confrontation Beast-Porcupine Fist Mārashiya (Episode 23)
Engine Sentai Go-onger – Savage Water Barbaric Machine Beast Pipe Banki (Episode 2)

Drama CDs
Samejima-kun to Sasahara-kun – Manager
Taiyō no Ie – Mr. Nakamura
Paradox Live – Iori Suiseki

Video games
Aokana: Four Rhythm Across the Blue - Shion Aoyagi
Bomberman Jetters – Sharkun
Phoenix Wright: Ace Attorney − Spirit of Justice – Phoenix Wright
Pokémon Go – Tropius
Project X Zone 2 – Phoenix Wright
Re:Birthday Song Shinigami Kareshi – Syun
The Legend of Heroes: Trails in the Sky - Agate Crosner
Trauma Center: Second Opinion – Kousuke Tsukimori (Derek Stiles)
Teppen - Phoenix Wright

References

External links
Takayuki Kondo at Ryu's Seiyuu Info
 Official agency profile 
 

Japanese male video game actors
Japanese male voice actors
Living people
1978 births
Male voice actors from Tottori Prefecture
20th-century Japanese male actors
21st-century Japanese male actors